Manoel de Oliveira da Silva Júnior (born 24 September 1976) is a Brazilian professional footballer who plays as a defensive midfielder for Belo Jardim Futebol Clube.

Club career
Júnior was born in Paulista, Pernambuco. In his country, he played for modest clubs Grêmio Esportivo Anápolis and Associação Garanhuense de Atletismo.

In 2002, at the age of 26, Júnior moved abroad and signed with F.C. Paços de Ferreira from Portugal, making his debut in the Primeira Liga on 25 August in a 3–1 home win against Varzim SC (90 minutes played). He suffered relegation at the end of his second season.

In 2005–06, Júnior scored a career-best nine goals in 33 games to help his team rank in 11th position, back in the top division. In the summer he joined Ergotelis F.C. in Greece, going to play in several Super League campaigns with the side and eventually reuniting with former Paços teammate Beto. He was released on 7 May 2012, at nearly 36.

In December 2012, Júnior moved to another club in the country, second-tier Panetolikos FC. He participated in 29 matches in his first year, which ended in promotion to the top flight.

Júnior moved to Greek division two side Athlitiki Enosi Larissa F.C. on 24 July 2014, leaving the following December. After nearly three years of inactivity, he returned to his homeland and signed with amateurs Belo Jardim Futebol Clube.

References

External links
CBF data 

1976 births
Living people
Sportspeople from Pernambuco
Brazilian footballers
Association football midfielders
Campeonato Brasileiro Série D players
Grêmio Esportivo Anápolis players
Primeira Liga players
Liga Portugal 2 players
F.C. Paços de Ferreira players
Super League Greece players
Football League (Greece) players
Ergotelis F.C. players
Panetolikos F.C. players
Athlitiki Enosi Larissa F.C. players
Brazilian expatriate footballers
Expatriate footballers in Portugal
Expatriate footballers in Greece
Brazilian expatriate sportspeople in Portugal
Brazilian expatriate sportspeople in Greece
People from Paulista